Cozen O'Connor P.C. is an international law firm based in Center City Philadelphia, Pennsylvania. The firm was ranked 74th on the AmLaw 100 Survey in 2021, 92nd on the Global 200, 1st in the nation in The American Lawyer in its Midlevel Associates Satisfaction Survey in 2017, and ranked 79th on the National Law Journal'ss list of the 500 Largest American Law Firms in 2017.  Although the firm was founded in 1970, it has pursued a strategy of aggressive growth and has expanded to more than 665 lawyers in 25 cities across two continents.

Cozen O'Connor is one of many large law firms providing counsel to the detainees at the Guantanamo Bay detention camp.

Recent developments

Formation of Government Relations Subsidiary
In September 2009, the firm launched the subsidiary, Cozen O'Connor Public Strategies.
  The subsidiary operates out of the firm's Washington, D.C., Pennsylvania, New York, New Jersey and Delaware offices.  Chaired by Mark Alderman, the group also includes Managing Partner, Howard Schweitzer, the first COO of the Troubled Asset Relief Program.

Involvement in the Mayoral campaign of Bob Brady
Cozen O'Connor filed a lawsuit in the Philadelphia County Court of Common Pleas against the Philadelphia Board of Ethics in an attempt to lift campaign contribution limits for the 2007 Philadelphia mayoral election.  The firm had represented Bob Brady in his efforts off a ballot challenge from Tom Knox, and wanted to be paid for its work.  City law limited campaign contributions to $2,500 for individuals and $10,000 for law firms, political action committees and unincorporated businesses.  In February 2011, the court ruled that the firm has the standing to challenge the ethics board. In reversing the lower courts, Justice Max Baer said Cozen O'Connor sufficiently pleaded in its declaratory judgment action its own inability to forgive the total debt without violating campaign finance laws.

References

External links
 Homepage
 Profile from LexisNexis Martindale-Hubbell

Law firms based in Philadelphia
Law firms established in 1970
1970 establishments in Pennsylvania